CBC Sudbury refers to:
CBCS-FM, CBC Radio One on 99.9 FM
CBBS-FM, CBC Radio 2 on 90.1 FM
CBLT-6 (formerly CKNC-TV), CBC Television on channel 9, rebroadcasts CBLT

SRC Sudbury refers to:
CBON-FM, Première Chaîne on 98.1 FM
CBBX-FM, Espace Musique on 90.9 FM
CBLFT-2, Télévision de Radio-Canada on channel 13, rebroadcasts CBLFT